Ecclesfield East railway station was built by the South Yorkshire Railway on their "Blackburn Valley" line between Sheffield Wicker and Barnsley. The station was intended to serve the parish of Ecclesfield, near Sheffield, South Yorkshire, England, although it is some distance from the centre of the village.

The original "Ecclesfield" railway station was opened in September 1854 and closed just two years later. It was replaced by a new station opened in 1876, with buildings and staggered platforms linked by a footbridge and cost £1985 (including sidings and approach road). These buildings are identical to those at Meadowhall although it had staggered platforms. By this time the line was worked by the Manchester Sheffield and Lincolnshire Railway and the trains ran into their Sheffield Victoria Station. The station closed on 7 December 1953 and has been completely dismantled.

The nearby station of Ecclesfield West was initially also known as Ecclesfield.

References

External links
 Ecclesfield East station (shown closed) on navigable 1955 O. S. map
 South Yorkshire Railway, Ecclesfield history pages

Ecclesfield
Disused railway stations in Sheffield
Former South Yorkshire Railway stations
Railway stations in Great Britain opened in 1854
Railway stations in Great Britain closed in 1856
Railway stations in Great Britain opened in 1876
Railway stations in Great Britain closed in 1953